Hunt Block (full name Huntington Macdonald Block, born February 16, 1954) is an American actor. Block graduated from Harvard University with a Bachelor of Fine Arts degree and has enjoyed a successful acting career over many decades.

Career
Block was discovered selling Buick Century automobiles at the Chicago Auto Show. Early on he made numerous TV commercials, short films, and experimental theater pieces. While living in Tribeca in New York City, he performed in Off-Off Broadway and Broadway productions for Arthur Laurents, Edward Albee, Robert Smith, Doric Wilson and others. He appeared in William Shakespeare's As You Like It, Forever After, A Loss Of Memory, Provicante di Saliva, The Bald Soprano, Make Mine Kafka!, and others. 

Block has worked with film directors Arthur Hiller, Peter Medak, Lee Katzin, Alvin Rakoff, and Phillip Noyce. Block played the roles of U.S. President Howard Lewis in the film Salt, Sebastian Weinberg in My Best Day, Walter Hill in Only I..., the U.S. Olympian Robert Garrett (1875-1961), a young scion of a wealthy Baltimore railroad and financier family in the NBC TV  miniseries The First Olympics: Athens 1896. He had starring roles in several other TV movies and pilots and has appeared steadily in lead roles in several dramatic serials, such as Knots Landing, and numerous TV soap opera daytime dramas, including Guiding Light, All My Children, As the World Turns, and One Life to Live. He has voiced multiple commercial and digital campaigns, performed with the Indonesian poetry forum Yang Mengatakan, in Balinese Shadow plays, and in the Norwegian Arctic Rights Group Vakne Opp's production of Ballong. He is a regular contributor to Sweet Dreams, an audio series of bedtime stories.

Personal life
Block is the son of Huntington T. Block, founder (in 1962) of the oldest and largest managing general underwriter of Fine Art Insurance in the United States, and is the brother of film producer and CEO of Miramax, Bill Block.

Filmography

Movies

Television

References

External links
 

1953 births
Living people
Harvard University alumni
American male television actors
American male soap opera actors
People from Glen Burnie, Maryland